Sipahiya is a 1949 Indian thriller film directed and produced by Aspi Irani. It stars Madhubala and Yakub. The music of the film was composed by C. Ramachandra.

Cast 

 Madhubala as Rani
 Yakub as Banke
 Agha as Bansi
 Kanhaiyalal as Rasia
 Jilloo as Rani's mother

References

External links 

1940s Hindi-language films
1949 films
Hindi-language thriller films